William Tonge (14 April 1862 – 2 May 1943) was an English cricketer. He played two matches for Gloucestershire in 1880.

References

1862 births
1943 deaths
English cricketers
Gloucestershire cricketers
People from Surrey
Norfolk cricketers